Jamar Dontarius Adams (born November 29, 1985) is a former American football safety. He was signed by the Seattle Seahawks as an undrafted free agent in 2008. He played college football at Michigan.  Adams has also played for the Philadelphia Eagles.

Early years
Adams attended David W. Butler High School, where he recorded 225 tackles, 23 interceptions, 3 sacks, 6 forced fumbles, 2 fumble recoveries, and 1 blocked field goal in his four-year career as a safety and cornerback. Adams graduated in 2004, and was a highly touted prospect who was recruited by many prestigious universities. Adams was ranked as a three-star prospect and the 18th best safety in the class of 2004 according to Rivals.com.

College career
Adams attended the University of Michigan from 2004 to 2008. Adams played in nine games as a true freshman in 2004 at Michigan. He recorded six tackles (five solo), while playing mostly on special teams and occasionally as a reserve defensive back. As a sophomore in 2005, Adams started 8 games including the final six, and he compiled 27 tackles (20 solo) with one tackle for a loss and two pass breakups.

As a Junior in 2006, Adams made 47 tackles (39 solo), one sack, three tackles for loss, and one forced fumble. He recorded one interception and deflected seven other passes, earning him All-Big Ten Conference second-team recognition as a Junior.

In Adams' senior season, he once again earned second-team All-Big Ten accolades and helped Michigan win the 2008 Capitol One Bowl. Adams started all 13 games at strong safety and led the team with a career-high 92 tackles (39 solo), the second-highest total by a Big Ten defensive back in 2007. He added one sack with 2.5 tackles for loss, and he deflected 13 passes while also registering 3 interceptions.

In his career, Adams played in 47 games (starting in 34), made 172 tackles (103 solo), two sacks, 6.5 tackles-for-loss, one forced fumble, 22 passes broken up, and four interceptions for 58 yards.

Professional career

Seattle Seahawks
Adams was signed as an undrafted free agent by the Seattle Seahawks on April 27, 2008, even though many draft analysts predicted that he would be picked as high as the 3rd round. He played well enough in the preseason to earn a spot on Seattle's practice squad. Adams spent the majority of his rookie season on the Seahawks' practice squad, but did play in one game, marking his NFL debut, on November 16 against the Arizona Cardinals. Adams did not record any statistics playing on special teams against the Cardinals.

After being waived on September 5, 2009, Adams was re-signed to the practice squad. He was signed off the practice squad on November 3, making his season debut against the Minnesota Vikings on November 22, 2009. Excluding the St. Louis Rams game on November 29, 2009, Adams played in all remaining regular season games for the Seahawks, registering four tackles on limited special teams play.

Philadelphia Eagles
Adams was signed to the Philadelphia Eagles' practice squad on September 22, 2010. He was released on September 30. He was re-signed to the team's practice squad on December 21. He was promoted to the active roster on December 31. He was waived during final roster cuts on September 3, 2011.

Personal life

Adams began working for Related Companies in 2012 as a development associate.

References

External links

Philadelphia Eagles bio
Seattle Seahawks bio

1985 births
Living people
Players of American football from Charlotte, North Carolina
American football safeties
Michigan Wolverines football players
Seattle Seahawks players
Philadelphia Eagles players
African-American players of American football
21st-century African-American sportspeople
20th-century African-American people